Acre is a Victorian village situated along the A56 Blackburn Road between the village of Rising Bridge and the town of Haslingden in Rossendale Lancashire, about one mile north of Haslingden town centre. It was founded in 1861.

External links

Villages in Lancashire
Geography of the Borough of Rossendale